Scholefield is a surname. Notable people with the surname include:

Adam Scholefield (born 1985), English water polo player
Alan Scholefield (born 1931), South African writer
Edward Scholefield (1893–1929), British Royal Air Force officer and test pilot
Guy Scholefield (1877–1963), New Zealand journalist, historian, archivist, librarian and editor
James Scholefield (1789–1853), English classical scholar
Joshua Scholefield (1775–1844), English businessman and politician
Mark Scholefield (1828–1858), English Victoria Cross recipient
William Scholefield (1809–1867), English businessman and politician

See also
Scofield (disambiguation)
Schofield (disambiguation)